Thiago Monteiro may refer to:

Thiago Monteiro (table tennis) (born 1981), Brazilian table tennis player
Thiago Monteiro (tennis) (born 1994), Brazilian tennis player

See also
 Tiago Monteiro (born 1976), Portuguese racing driver